Ethmia nigroapicella, commonly known as the kou leafworm, is a moth of the family Depressariidae. It is found in Madagascar, the Seychelles, India, Assam, Burma, Samoa, the Philippines, Hawaii, Taiwan, Japan and Australia.

The forewings are overlaid with fifteen black dots on a grey background and a row of seven marginal dots. The hindwings are orange-yellow, but the apical patch is dark brown and covers one-seventh of the hindwing.

The larvae feed on Ehretia species (including Ehretia dicksoni var. japonica, Ehretia laevis and Ehretia buxifolia) and Cordia subcordata.

This moth figures on a 25-cent stamp of Kiribati from 1980.

References

External links
 
 
 lebarcoding.org - picture of Ethmia nigroapicella

nigroapicella
Moths described in 1880
Moths of Asia
Moths of Madagascar
Moths of Japan
Moths of Seychelles
Moths of Réunion